"Right Here Right Now" is an electronica song performed by Swedish band BWO. The song was released as a second single from their fourth studio album, Big Science in Sweden, Norway, Finland and Denmark, on May 27, 2009.

It was released in the United Kingdom on December 7, 2009 (originally August) with added vocals from Velvet remixed by Cahill. However, this date has once again been pushed back and the release date is now 21 December. It has left many UK fans wondering if the track will ever be released.

As of January 20, 2011, the track has not been released in the UK.

Track list

In Sweden
Digital download; CD single
 "Right Here Right Now" (radio edit) 3:28
 "Right Here Right Now" (Oscar Holter radio mix) 3:29
 "Right Here Right Now" (SoundFactory radio mix) 3:55
 "Right Here Right Now" (Skyylab remix) 5:22
 "Right Here Right Now" (Oscar Holter extended club mix) 4:24
 "Right Here Right Now" (SoundFactory extended club mix) 5:06
 "Right Here Right Now" (Myon & Shane 54 remix) 6:39
 "Right Here Right Now" (SoundFactory Paradise anthem) 8:30
 "Right Here Right Now" (SoundFactory Paradise dub) 8:59
 "Right Here Right Now" (Miss Leeloo Bought The Bouquet mix) 4:30

References

2009 singles
BWO (band) songs
Songs written by Alexander Bard
Songs written by Martin Rolinski
Songs written by Anders Hansson (songwriter)
2009 songs